Events in the year 2023 in Tonga.

Incumbents 

 Monarch: Tupou VI
 Prime Minister: Siaosi Sovaleni

Events 
Ongoing — COVID-19 pandemic in Tonga

 19 January – 2023 Tongatapu 8 by-election: The election was won by Johnny Taione.
 2023 Super Rugby Pacific season

References 

 
2020s in Tonga
Years of the 21st century in Tonga
Tonga
Tonga